Lac de Madine is a lake at the border between Meurthe-et-Moselle and Meuse departments, France. At an elevation of 240 m, its surface area is 11 km².

Madine
Landforms of Meuse (department)
Landforms of Meurthe-et-Moselle
LMadine